John Malcolm Padgett (30 November 1916 – 1985) was an English professional footballer who played as an outside right.

Career
Born in Ilkeston, Padgett joined Bradford City from Townend Juniors in 1937. He made 2 league appearances for the club, scoring 1 goal. He left the club in June 1938 to join Bradford (Park Avenue), and later played for Denaby United, Peterborough United and Frickley Colliery. At Peterborough he made 30 Midland League appearances, scoring 11 goals, as well as 2 goals in 9 FA Cup games.

Sources

References

1916 births
1985 deaths
English footballers
Bradford City A.F.C. players
Bradford (Park Avenue) A.F.C. players
Denaby United F.C. players
Peterborough United F.C. players
Frickley Athletic F.C. players
English Football League players
Association football outside forwards
Midland Football League players